Arzos Peak is the sharp rocky peak on the west side of northern Sentinel Range in Ellsworth Mountains, Antarctica rising to 1893 m on the side ridge extending from a peak standing on the main crest of the range just north-northwest of Mount Dawson.  Arzos is the ancient Thracian name of Sazliyka River in Southern Bulgaria.

Location
US mapping in 1961.

See also
 Mountains in Antarctica

Maps
 Newcomer Glacier.  Scale 1:250 000 topographic map.  Reston, Virginia: US Geological Survey, 1961.
 Antarctic Digital Database (ADD). Scale 1:250000 topographic map of Antarctica. Scientific Committee on Antarctic Research (SCAR). Since 1993, regularly updated.

Notes

References
 Arzos Peak. SCAR Composite Gazetteer of Antarctica.
 Bulgarian Antarctic Gazetteer. Antarctic Place-names Commission. (details in Bulgarian, basic data in English)

External links
 Arzos Peak. Copernix satellite image

Ellsworth Mountains
Bulgaria and the Antarctic
Mountains of Ellsworth Land